The 1965 Cincinnati Reds season consisted of the Reds finishing in fourth place in the National League, with a record of 89–73, eight games behind the NL and World Series Champion Los Angeles Dodgers. The Reds were managed by Dick Sisler and played their home games at Crosley Field.

The Reds led the major leagues in most offensive categories. They recorded the most runs scored (825), hits (1,544), doubles (268), triples (61), RBI (776), batting average (.273), on-base percentage (.339) and slugging percentage (.439). They were second in home runs in the majors with 183, behind the Milwaukee Braves.

Regular season 
Jim Maloney became the fourth pitcher in major league history to throw two no-hitters in one season.

Season standings

Record vs. opponents

Notable transactions 
 June 8, 1965: 1965 Major League Baseball Draft
Bernie Carbo was drafted by the Reds in the 1st round.
Johnny Bench was drafted by the Reds in the 2nd round.
Paul Reuschel was drafted by the Reds in the 26th round, but did not sign.

Roster

Player stats

Batting

Starters by position 
Note: Pos = Position; G = Games played; AB = At bats; H = Hits; Avg. = Batting average; HR = Home runs; RBI = Runs batted in

Other batters 
Note: G = Games played; AB = At bats; H = Hits; Avg. = Batting average; HR = Home runs; RBI = Runs batted in

Pitching

Starting pitchers 
Note: G = Games pitched; IP = Innings pitched; W = Wins; L = Losses; ERA = Earned run average; SO = Strikeouts

Other pitchers 
Note: G = Games pitched; IP = Innings pitched; W = Wins; L = Losses; ERA = Earned run average; SO = Strikeouts

Relief pitchers 
Note: G = Games pitched; W = Wins; L = Losses; SV = Saves; ERA = Earned run average; SO = Strikeouts

Awards and honors 
Gold Glove Award
 Leo Cárdenas

All-Stars 
All-Star Game
 Pete Rose, second baseman, starter
 Leo Cárdenas, reserve
 Johnny Edwards, reserve
 Sammy Ellis, reserve
 Frank Robinson, reserve

Farm system

Notes

References 
1965 Cincinnati Reds season at Baseball Reference

Cincinnati Reds seasons
Cincinnati Reds season
Cincinnati Reds